The West London Orbital is a proposed extension to the London Overground railway system. The extension would make use of a combination of existing freight and passenger lines including the Dudding Hill Line, North London Line and Hounslow Loop.

If the extension were opened, it would improve rail connectivity across West and North-West London and establish a number of new connections to existing radial rail infrastructure including Thameslink, the Jubilee line, the Bakerloo line, High Speed 2, Crossrail and the Piccadilly line. It is anticipated the line would be operational by the mid-2020s, due to the fact that it makes use of existing underused rail infrastructure rather than requiring significant lengths of new track or tunnels to be built. The planned line would follow a portion of the route of the former Super Outer Circle that was operated by the Midland Railway from 1878 to 1880.

The scheme is supported by the Mayor and Transport for London's Transport Strategy; it is still at the proposal stage, although TfL published a business case for the plans in August 2019.

Detail of the scheme

The West London Orbital line consists of a number of distinct sections: The Dudding Hill Line, the North London Line and the Hounslow Loop. The Dudding Hill line itself has had no scheduled passenger service for over a century. It has no stations, no electrification and a  speed limit with semaphore signalling, and is lightly used by freight and very occasional passenger charter trains.

Taken together, this set of routes would be known as the “West London Orbital” railway.

In March 2017 the West London Alliance group of local authorities commissioned a study to assess the feasibility of the line so that a decision could be taken as to whether it merited pursuing further. This study found that:

 The route is technically feasible.
 The scheme represents a high value for money, with a benefit-cost ratio (BCR) of 2.2.
 Peak three-hour demand at 3,000 passengers southbound and 2,500 passengers northbound in 2031. This suggests that the level of passenger demand may be able to sustain a regular four-trains-per-hour or more service along the line.
 The line would enable significant new development to be undertaken along its length, supporting the creation of new homes and jobs.
 It would drastically improve orbital travel times around West London compared with the equivalent journey by car. For example, a journey from Barnet to Park Royal (enabling a change on to Crossrail or HS2 services) would take approximately  minutes. A trip from Acton to Cricklewood or Brent Cross would take approximately  minutes. A journey along the whole line from Barnet to Hounslow would take approximately 39 minutes (times the same for reverse journeys).
 Eight trains per hour in each direction would be achievable given existing traffic along the length of the route.
 It would connect town centres and regeneration areas, including the 45,000 new homes and 86,000 new jobs that will be created at Old Oak Common, Wembley and Brent Cross regeneration areas, putting a greater number of jobs and homes within easy reach of one another and supporting intensification in growth areas.
 It would remove a significant number of cars from the road, reducing congestion and improving journey times, particularly along the North Circular Road, as the population of London approaches 10 million over the next 20 years.
 Potential to unlock significant amount of new housing.
In June 2017 Transport for London published the Mayor's Transport Strategy, which stated that London government would work with the relevant boroughs to explore the feasibility of the proposed service, that would become the West London Orbital. In March 2018 the Mayor's Transport Strategy was published, which includes a proposal for this orbital connection to Old Oak between Hounslow and Brent Cross.

Current position 
{
  "type": "FeatureCollection",
  "features": [
    {
      "type": "Feature",
      "properties": {
        "stroke": "#d65603",
        "stroke-width": 7,
        "stroke-opacity": 1
      },
      "geometry": {
        "type": "LineString",
        "coordinates": [
          [
            -0.21251678466796875,
            51.55836986133279
          ],
          [
            -0.2165508270263672,
            51.560904504753225
          ],
          [
            -0.22187232971191406,
            51.561384737061616
          ],
          [
            -0.22805213928222653,
            51.55878341806116
          ],
          [
            -0.22285938262939453,
            51.562465241213346
          ],
          [
            -0.2222156524658203,
            51.56394589039038
          ],
          [
            -0.2227306365966797,
            51.56522641296103
          ],
          [
            -0.22891044616699216,
            51.57034814262767
          ],
          [
            -0.23775100708007812,
            51.5779229765343
          ],
          [
            -0.2387809753417969,
            51.58010984161357
          ]
        ]
      }
    },
    {
      "type": "Feature",
      "properties": {
        "stroke": "#d65603",
        "stroke-width": 7,
        "stroke-opacity": 1
      },
      "geometry": {
        "type": "LineString",
        "coordinates": [
          [
            -0.22800922393798828,
            51.55882343948045
          ],
          [
            -0.23371696472167966,
            51.55695573571878
          ],
          [
            -0.24800777435302737,
            51.552926570711094
          ],
          [
            -0.2520418167114258,
            51.55012462307224
          ],
          [
            -0.25556087493896484,
            51.54494723723355
          ],
          [
            -0.25671958923339844,
            51.54126399591221
          ],
          [
            -0.25371551513671875,
            51.52529983831502
          ],
          [
            -0.25498151779174805,
            51.52258964707325
          ]
        ]
      }
    },
    {
      "type": "Feature",
      "properties": {
        "stroke": "#d65603",
        "stroke-width": 7,
        "stroke-opacity": 1
      },
      "geometry": {
        "type": "LineString",
        "coordinates": [
          [
            -0.25498688220977783,
            51.52258964707325
          ],
          [
            -0.25681614875793457,
            51.519298483707836
          ],
          [
            -0.2614617347717285,
            51.51249510208916
          ],
          [
            -0.2645087242126465,
            51.504989506403604
          ],
          [
            -0.2679848670959472,
            51.50115610069437
          ],
          [
            -0.27150392532348633,
            51.49861812856609
          ],
          [
            -0.28671741485595703,
            51.49238613958602
          ],
          [
            -0.2875328063964844,
            51.49144425363426
          ],
          [
            -0.28736114501953125,
            51.4901482936383
          ],
          [
            -0.28659939765930176,
            51.48962722717392
          ]
        ]
      }
    },
    {
      "type": "Feature",
      "properties": {
        "stroke": "#d65603",
        "stroke-width": 7,
        "stroke-opacity": 1
      },
      "geometry": {
        "type": "LineString",
        "coordinates": [
          [
            -0.28671741485595703,
            51.49239281955874
          ],
          [
            -0.29154539108276367,
            51.49046894696402
          ],
          [
            -0.2999997138977051,
            51.48982763805729
          ],
          [
            -0.31012773513793945,
            51.48739592650363
          ],
          [
            -0.31858205795288086,
            51.48458994432048
          ],
          [
            -0.32497644424438477,
            51.48166352182408
          ],
          [
            -0.33735752105712885,
            51.474553804593434
          ],
          [
            -0.36278486251831055,
            51.4615342698325
          ]
        ]
      }
    },
    {
      "type": "Feature",
      "properties": {
        "marker-color": "#d65603",
        "marker-size": "medium",
        "marker-symbol": "rail"
      },
      "geometry": {
        "type": "Point",
        "coordinates": [
          -0.23908138275146482,
          51.58000316770964
        ]
      }
    },
    {
      "type": "Feature",
      "properties": {
        "marker-color": "#d65603",
        "marker-size": "medium",
        "marker-symbol": "rail"
      },
      "geometry": {
        "type": "Point",
        "coordinates": [
          -0.21247386932373047,
          51.55820977384767
        ]
      }
    },
    {
      "type": "Feature",
      "properties": {
        "stroke": "#d65603",
        "stroke-width": 7,
        "stroke-opacity": 1
      },
      "geometry": {
        "type": "LineString",
        "coordinates": [
          [
            -0.19208908081054688,
            51.54828324922562
          ],
          [
            -0.1995134353637695,
            51.549430780808116
          ],
          [
            -0.20813941955566406,
            51.55354030762803
          ],
          [
            -0.21251678466796875,
            51.55834318012439
          ]
        ]
      }
    },
    {
      "type": "Feature",
      "properties": {
        "marker-color": "#d65603",
        "marker-size": "medium",
        "marker-symbol": "rail"
      },
      "geometry": {
        "type": "Point",
        "coordinates": [
          -0.1920783519744873,
          51.54824989031646
        ]
      }
    },
    {
      "type": "Feature",
      "properties": {
        "marker-color": "#d65603",
        "marker-size": "large",
        "marker-symbol": "rail"
      },
      "geometry": {
        "type": "Point",
        "coordinates": [
          -0.23178577423095703,
          51.57273541840907
        ]
      }
    },
    {
      "type": "Feature",
      "properties": {
        "marker-color": "#d65603",
        "marker-size": "medium",
        "marker-symbol": "rail"
      },
      "geometry": {
        "type": "Point",
        "coordinates": [
          -0.28659939765930176,
          51.489620546795976
        ]
      }
    },
    {
      "type": "Feature",
      "properties": {
        "marker-color": "#d65603",
        "marker-size": "medium",
        "marker-symbol": "rail"
      },
      "geometry": {
        "type": "Point",
        "coordinates": [
          -0.30968785285949707,
          51.4875028176487
        ]
      }
    },
    {
      "type": "Feature",
      "properties": {
        "marker-color": "#d65603",
        "marker-size": "medium",
        "marker-symbol": "rail"
      },
      "geometry": {
        "type": "Point",
        "coordinates": [
          -0.3247404098510742,
          51.48177042640725
        ]
      }
    },
    {
      "type": "Feature",
      "properties": {
        "marker-color": "#d65603",
        "marker-size": "medium",
        "marker-symbol": "rail"
      },
      "geometry": {
        "type": "Point",
        "coordinates": [
          -0.33676743507385254,
          51.47487456758712
        ]
      }
    },
    {
      "type": "Feature",
      "properties": {
        "marker-color": "#d65603",
        "marker-size": "medium",
        "marker-symbol": "rail"
      },
      "geometry": {
        "type": "Point",
        "coordinates": [
          -0.3627634048461914,
          51.46154429657085
        ]
      }
    },
    {
      "type": "Feature",
      "properties": {
        "marker-color": "#d65603",
        "marker-size": "medium",
        "marker-symbol": "london-underground"
      },
      "geometry": {
        "type": "Point",
        "coordinates": [
          -0.27038812637329096,
          51.49944632447973
        ]
      }
    },
    {
      "type": "Feature",
      "properties": {
        "marker-color": "#d65603",
        "marker-size": "medium",
        "marker-symbol": "london-underground"
      },
      "geometry": {
        "type": "Point",
        "coordinates": [
          -0.2629852294921875,
          51.508735781226605
        ]
      }
    },
    {
      "type": "Feature",
      "properties": {
        "marker-color": "#d65603",
        "marker-size": "large",
        "marker-symbol": "london-underground"
      },
      "geometry": {
        "type": "Point",
        "coordinates": [
          -0.25562524795532227,
          51.535565060507984
        ]
      }
    },
    {
      "type": "Feature",
      "properties": {
        "marker-color": "#d65603",
        "marker-size": "large",
        "marker-symbol": "london-underground"
      },
      "geometry": {
        "type": "Point",
        "coordinates": [
          -0.24707436561584473,
          51.55322676915072
        ]
      }
    },
    {
      "type": "Feature",
      "properties": {
        "marker-color": "#d65603",
        "marker-size": "large",
        "marker-symbol": "london-underground"
      },
      "geometry": {
        "type": "Point",
        "coordinates": [
          -0.2548527717590332,
          51.522736508860255
        ]
      }
    }
  ]
}

The London Mayor's Transport Strategy (MTS), published on 28 February 2018 and ratified by the London Assembly on 8 March 2018, includes plans for a West London Orbital railway line under Proposal 88. The mayor's proposal for the service highlights that utilising new and existing orbital connections in west London could also improve public transport connections in the city centre.

The West London Alliance group of local authorities have expressed support for the West London Orbital Scheme, and have confirmed that it will be incorporated in to all Local Plans. Discussions are currently underway between West London councils and London government on the future of the scheme.

A number of independent analyses of the scheme have been published, including by Modern Railways magazine and the independent blogging community

In April 2019, £320 million of funding was approved for a new Brent Cross West railway station, that would also serve the potential new service.

In June 2019, Transport for London published the Strategic Outline Business Case for the scheme and concluded that there was a strong case for the scheme as it had a medium to high benefit-cost ratio. TfL found that for 8 trains per hour in the core the BCR was between 1.4 and 1.8 and for 4 trains per hour it would be 1.7 to 2.0. As the scheme was found to have a strong business case, TfL stated that it intended to proceed to the next stage which will look at how the scheme can be funded. A more detailed business case is expected to be developed in the next 18 months.

Earlier proposals 
A number of routes have previously been examined for new orbital tube lines and improved connectivity across West and North London. It was considered that the most likely route of the previous proposal would be a north–south route running from Brent Cross to Surbiton, via Wembley Park, Ealing Broadway, Richmond and Kingston fully underground, connecting several London Underground and National Rail lines, including the  Elizabeth line at Ealing Broadway.

The proposal envisaged an underground driverless light rail train system similar to the Docklands Light Railway, and updated "to the most modern standards".

The promoters cited a number of reasons why they believed an underground scheme would be cost-effective at £1.75 billion: with lower tunnelling costs as the tunnel diameter would be smaller than for a heavy rail scheme; there are no other rail tunnels to avoid (as in central London); and the subsoil strata are suitable for modern tunnel boring machines.

An unrelated scheme of the same name was previously proposed in June 2008 by the West London Business group. That proposal involved the construction of a new underground line across West and South West London and did not progress beyond concept stage.

Additionally, Regional Eurostar proposals meant to send trains from Eurostar lines into Waterloo International station to London Heathrow Airport used parts of the orbital between Willesden Junction and Acton.

Alternative orbital schemes
A number of other notable orbital rail schemes for London have been previously proposed:
R25 railway orbital around the Zone 3 area of London. First proposed in the Mayor of London's £1.3trn London Infrastructure 2050 plan, the line would use some existing National Rail and London Overground lines, linked by stretches of new railway.
 Orbirail was a 2012 proposal for an outer "super loop" service roughy equivalent to a M25 for rail. The West London Orbital proposal makes use of some elements of this concept.
 The 'North and West London Light Railway' (or the 'Brent Cross Railway') is a proposed rapid transit network. The scheme was originally developed by the London group of the Campaign for Better Transport, and mainly uses existing or abandoned surface railway corridors.

References

External links



Proposed rail infrastructure in London
Proposed railway lines in London